Opusgenitalia is the third studio album by Portuguese grindcore band Holocausto Canibal. It was recorded in 2005 at Grave Studios Studios, in Braga, Portugal, being produced and mixed by Pedro Alves (who previously produced "Sublime Massacre Corpóreo"), while mastering duties were handled at MegaWimp Studios in Germany and released in 2006 through German Cudgel Vertrieb.

After several delays due to the graphic nature of the artwork (that was constantly censored by German authorities), "Opusgenitalia" was finally released in 2006 and featured a more brutal, fast and intense songwriting, pushing the band's sound into a brand new level of brutality and obscenity. Songs like "Fetofilia - Incestuosa Sodomia Fetal", "Vulva Rasgada", "Amizade Fálica" and "Empalada Via Espinal Dorsal - Empalamento II" would grow into marks of the genre in Portugal, just as had happened before with some of "Sublime Massacre Corpóreo"'s tunes.

Just like their previous opus, the band included three electronic tracks: "Analéptica Anergia Sideroblástica - GHB Fx" (Analeptic Sideroblastic Anergy - GHB Fx), "Apraxia Digital Com Cyber Leucorreia Hi-Tech" (Digital Apraxy With Hi-Tech Cyber Leukhorrhea) and "Neuro Discrasia Sináptica - Interferências no Núcleo Tegmental Pedunculopontino" (Synaptic Neuro Discrasy - Pedunculpontine Tegmental Nucleus Interferences).

The track presented as "Tema Oculto" (Occult Song) is a cover from Carcass's "Reek Of Putrefaction".

Track listing
All music composed by Holocausto Canibal. All lyrics written by Z. Pedro. "Analéptica Anergia Sideroblástica - GHB Fx (Analeptic Sideroblastic Anergy - GHB Fx)" and 	"Apraxia Digital Com Cyber Leucorreia Hi-Tech" (Digital Apraxy With Hi-Tech Cyber Leukhorrhea) remixes by Fabrice Costeira and "Neuro Discrasia Sináptica - Interferências no Núcleo Tegmental Pedunculopontino	(Synaptic Neuro Discrasy - Pedunculpontine Tegmental Nucleus Interferences)" remix by M1R.

Credits

Holocausto Canibal
Carlos Guerro - vocals 
Nuno Pereira - guitar
Eduardo Fernandes - guitar, vocals
Jose Pedro - bass 
Ivan Saraiva - drums

Additional personnel
Christophe Szpajdel – logo

References

2006 albums
Holocausto Canibal albums